Alice's Wonderland Bakery is an American computer-animated fantasy comedy children's television series created for Disney Junior by Chelsea Beyl, inspired by Alice in Wonderland (1951). The series centers on Alice, a young baker who works at the Wonderland Bakery and is the great-granddaughter of the original Alice Pleasance Liddell. Rosa—the Princess of Hearts—Hattie, and Fergie the white rabbit accompany her on her culinary explorations throughout the kingdom. The show intends to highlight the importance of food, which is used as a form of self-expression and creativity. Libby Rue, Abigail Estrella, CJ Uy, Jack Stanton, Secunda Wood, and Audrey Wasilewski voice the primary characters.

The show is produced by Disney Television Animation and premiered on Disney Junior on February 9, 2022. On the same day of the premiere, the first six episodes were released early on Disney+. In April 2022, the series was renewed for a second season. Critical reviews of the show have generally been positive. At the 1st Children's and Family Emmy Awards, Eden Espinosa (who voices the Queen of Hearts) received a nomination for Outstanding Voice Performance in a Preschool Animated Program.

Plot 
The series revolves around Alice, the great-granddaughter of the original Alice Pleasance Liddell, who is a young baker working at the Wonderland Bakery. As she explores the kingdom on various culinary adventures, she is accompanied by Fergie the white rabbit, Hattie, and Rosa—the Princess of Hearts.

The teapot-shaped Wonderland Bakery has a kitchen where some of the equipment are animated, namely the oven and the mixer. The bakery also has a pantry which is vertical tunnel where the ingredients are on shelves on the sides, and anyone who enters will mostly float inside as if they are in space. The desserts (and to lesser-extent foods) the characters make are mostly magical, resulting either troublesome or pleasant effects.

Cast and characters

Main 
 Libby Rue as Alice, the great-granddaughter of the original Alice Pleasance Liddell and a promising young baker at the magical Wonderland Bakery
 CJ Uy as Hattie, a "mad hatter" boy and Alice's friend who is extremely silly
 Jack Stanton as Fergie the White Rabbit, Alice's best friend who admires her greatly
 Abigail Estrella as Princess Rosa, the Princess of Hearts and Alice's creative friend
 Secunda Wood as Cookie, a magical cookbook previously owned by Alice's great-grandmother
 Audrey Wasilewski as Dinah, Alice's pet cat who always accompanies her

Recurring 
 Craig Ferguson as The Doorknob
 Eden Espinosa as Queen of Hearts
 Jon Secada as King of Hearts
 Vanessa Bayer  as Tweedle Do
 Bobby Moynihan as Tweedle Don't
 Donald Faison as Harry the March Hare
 Rich Sommer as Captain Dodo
 Max Mittelman as Cheshire Cat
 George Salazar as Dad Hatter
 Melissa van der Schyff as Jojo
 Mandy Gonzalez as Mother Rose
 Yvette Nicole Brown as Mama Rabbit
 Lesley Nicol as Iris
 Ali Stroker as Daisy

Guest 
 Ana Gasteyer as Kiki
 Yuri Lowenthal as Jay
 Lamorne Morris as Dandy
 Christopher Fitzgerald as Thistle
 Matthew Moy as David of Spades
 James Monroe Iglehart as Oliver
 Kausar Mohammed as Mrs. Parvaneh
 Marcel Nahapetian as Saeed

Episodes

Production 

Alice's Wonderland Bakery is based on Disney's animated feature Alice in Wonderland (1951), which in turn is based on the Alice book series by Lewis Caroll. In the film, there is a scene in which the Mad Hatter hosts a tea party with teapots that pipe music, hats producing three-layers frosted cakes, and exploding firework candles in the sky. Disney Television Animation decided to produce a heritage project based upon the scene, which would also take inspiration from the sense of connection brought by food. Creator Chelsea Beyl said: "I started thinking about all the whimsy, the comedy, and the peculiar characters that are in the original movie and thought, 'Wow, preschoolers are going to love this' ... It's silly. And then we're combining all that with baking, which, of course, kids love to do as well." In May 2021, Disney Junior greenlit to series, to air on the network in 2022.

According to co-executive producer and art director Frank Montagna, the shift in storytelling from a 1950s 2D-animated film to a 2022 computer-animated preschool TV series was unexpectedly simple. He stated that there are many enjoyable activities in Wonderland, such as the tea parties, cards, and mazes. The team removed the frightening elements from the original film and kept the entertaining ones. Throughout the book and the film, there are references to the words "Eat me" and "Drink me". Because of this, Montaga came up with the idea of fusing Alice in Wonderland with a bakery when Beyl initially presented the show to him. The show highlights the importance of food, which is used as a form of creativity and self-expression; Alice makes friends and learns of other cultures through food. Beyl stated that "food [is] essentially [Alice's] superpower ... [and] how she connects with all these curious and peculiar characters". The series pays homage to the original Alice, who is always thinking, by having its version of Alice constantly trying to figure out things.

It did not take Montagna long to come up with the design for Alice's Wonderland Bakery since the original Alice in Wonderland "has always been such a core part of [his] being". Since the original designs were so shaped-driven and everything was already round, bouncy, and rubbery, he found converting them into 3D models rather easy. The team at ICON Creative Studio, according to Montagna, worked tirelessly to give the show a "bouncy and rubbery" feel, particularly with the Cheshire Cat—the only character from the 1951 film to appear in the series. Montagna believed that the team truly needed him to embody his role from the original film. Since television computer animation budgets were rather small, many factors needed to be considered carefully. For the character to be correctly rigged, the team would need to be very clear about how they wanted the character to look.

The team wanted the characters to truly reflect the children of that time, which also required giving them origins that Carroll may never have imagined. Beyl sought to reimagine some characters from the original film to enrich Wonderland with a wider range of cultures. The Hatter family's character design, kitchen—as well as the recipes Alice and Hattie cook together—are drawn from Japanese culture. Meanwhile, several aspects of the Hearts family were influenced by Cuban cuisine and culture, including their dialogue (which includes Spanish words), clothing, palace, and set design. The show later introduces a Persian-influenced caterpillar family. Certain characters are also gender flipped. Numerous foods from different cultures are featured in the series; these include: pastelitos (Cuban), mochi (Japanese), carrot calzone, grape gazpacho, huevos habaneros and kuku sib zamini (Persian).

The series references several iterations of Alice in Wonderland, including the 2010 film directed by Tim Burton. The White Rabbit hole served as the model for Alice's pantry, which features an endless supply of food items. For the ingredients, the team aimed to combine wacky Wonderland-style elements with real-world meals. Examples of this are "Bread and Butterflies", "Disa-pears", and "Rea-pears". Since nothing is impossible in Wonderland, the team were able to incorporate many unrealistic ideas of food into the show, including an upside-down cake.

Music 
John Kavanaugh was appointed the series music director. He wrote and composed "The Baking Song", which appears often throughout the show in various forms: the queen sings a salsa rendition, while another episode features a version with Persian instruments. The 1951 film's song "The Unbirthday Song", as well as other songs by Kavanaugh, including "Food for Thought", are used in the series to convey concepts such as flexibility. The voice cast includes former Broadway performers because the emphasis on music required vocal talent. On February 11, 2022, Walt Disney Records released the show's digital soundtrack album. The main title theme was released as a single.

Broadcast 
The series originally premiered on February 9, 2022. On the same day, first six episodes were released early on on-demand and Disney+. The first season is streamable on Disney+, FuboTV, and Amazon Prime Video. The show was renewed for a second season in April 2022.

Reception

Critical reception 
Ashley Moulton gave the show three out of five stars in her review, in which she described it as "a fun treat, but not one of Disney's standouts". She praised the characters, worldbuilding, musical numbers, and themes, stating that "Alice's Wonderland Bakery mines author Lewis Carroll's treasure trove of source material and adds amazing sugary confections". Moulton did, however, express concern over the numerous desserts featured on the show and said there were many other types of foods Alice and her friends could cook. Fatherly writer Harlan Sharpe praised the show for "[not] trying to remake Alice in Wonderland, [but] trying to give families a magical and offbeat show that is pro-baking". An article from GeekMom favorably compared the series to the animated children's show True and the Rainbow Kingdom. The New York Times Laurel Graeber took notice of the cultural diversity of the characters and their voice actors compared to the original Alice in Wonderland.

Accolades 
Eden Espinosa received nominations for Best Voice-Over Actor (Television) and Outstanding Voice Performance in a Preschool Animated Program at the 2022 Imagen Awards and the 1st Children's and Family Emmy Awards, respectively.

See also 
 Alice in Wonderland (franchise)
 Alice's Adventures in Wonderland
 Through the Looking Glass

Notes

References

External links

 
 

2020s American animated television series
2020s American children's comedy television series
2022 American television series debuts
American computer-animated television series
American children's animated action television series
American children's animated adventure television series
American children's animated comedy television series
American children's animated fantasy television series
American children's animated musical television series
Alice in Wonderland (franchise)
English-language television shows
Disney Junior original programming
Television shows based on Alice in Wonderland
Animated series based on books
Television series based on Disney films
Animated television shows based on films
Animated television series about children
Works about food and drink
Works about friendship
Television series by Disney Television Animation